The 1914 Wellington City mayoral by-election was part of the New Zealand local elections held that same year. The polling was conducted using the standard first-past-the-post electoral method.

Background
John Luke had been Mayor of Wellington since his election in 1913. Luke sought re-election against former Mayor David McLaren who was defeated by Luke a year earlier and stood for the mayoralty once again. The third contestant was John Glover, a newspaper editor, who entered the contest for the newly formed Social Democratic Party (SDP), a more radical labour party. The divisions were deepened by McLaren's statement that SDP ringleader Bob Semple (later a councillor) was "as free from political principles as a frog from feathers". Glover's entry cut into McLaren's support base causing his polling to fall sharply from the previous two elections. Regardless of the divided labour vote, Luke won the contest with an outright majority.

The election came at the same time as the 1913 Great Strike, which began on the Wellington waterfront intensifying anti-Labour sentiment which assisted Luke in increasing his majority.

Results
The following table gives the election results:

Notes

References

Mayoral elections in Wellington
1914 elections in New Zealand
Politics of the Wellington Region
1910s in Wellington